Kyla Richey (born 20 June 1989) is a Canadian volleyball player. She is a member of the Canada women's national volleyball team since she made the Senior A team in 2008. Prior to that, she was a part of the Junior National team for three years from 2015-2017. Kyla is the current captain of Team Canada under head coach Tom Black. Her career is one of the longest Team Canada Women's Team stints in history competing at three consecutive World Championships.

She was part of the Canadian national team at the 2010 World Championships in Japan, the 2014 FIVB Volleyball Women's World Championship in Italy, and 2018 FIVB Volleyball Women's World Championship.

University career
Richey played U Sports volleyball for the University of British Columbia Thunderbirds for five seasons from 2007 to 2012. She won the U Sports National Championship in each of her five seasons with UBC and was named the Championship MVP for the 2009 match. For the 2011-12 season, in her final year, she won the Mary Lyons Award for U Sports Women's Volleyball Player of the Year.

Clubs
  SC Potsdam (2013)
  Yeşilyurt Istanbul (2013–2014)
  Tiboni Urbino (2014)
  Rote Raben Vilsbiburg (2015)
  Azeryol Baku (2015–2016)
  Panathinaikos (2016–2017)
  Jakarta Pertamina Energi (2017-2018)
  CV Universidad de San Martín de Porres (2018–present)

References

1989 births
Living people
Canadian women's volleyball players
Place of birth missing (living people)
Volleyball players at the 2015 Pan American Games
Pan American Games competitors for Canada
UBC Thunderbirds women's volleyball players
Outside hitters
Expatriate volleyball players in Germany
Expatriate volleyball players in Turkey
Expatriate volleyball players in Italy
Expatriate volleyball players in Azerbaijan
Expatriate volleyball players in Greece
Expatriate volleyball players in Indonesia
Canadian expatriate sportspeople in Germany
Canadian expatriate sportspeople in Turkey
Canadian expatriate sportspeople in Italy
Canadian expatriate sportspeople in Greece
Canadian expatriate sportspeople in Indonesia
Panathinaikos Women's Volleyball players
Yeşilyurt volleyballers
Canadian expatriate sportspeople in Azerbaijan
Canadian expatriate sportspeople in Peru
Expatriate volleyball players in Peru